The Walter Sillers State Office Building is a high-rise government office building in Jackson, Mississippi, USA. It was designed in the International Style and built from 1970 to 1972. It is the fifth-tallest building in Jackson. It is named after the politician Walter Sillers Jr.

See also 
 List of tallest buildings in Jackson, Mississippi

References

Government buildings completed in 1972
International style architecture in Mississippi
Skyscraper office buildings in Jackson, Mississippi
Government buildings in Mississippi